Sørnes is a Norwegian surname. Notable people with the surname include:

Rasmus Sørnes (1893–1967), Norwegian clockmaker and inventor
Tor Sørnes (1925–2017), Norwegian inventor, writer and politician
Sverre Sørnes (born 1945), Norwegian long-distance runner
Torgrim Sørnes (born 1956), Norwegian physician, historian and author

Norwegian-language surnames